Katoatau is an Oceanian surname. Notable people with the surname include:

 David Katoatau (born 1984), Kiribati weightlifter
 Ruben Katoatau (born 1997), Kiribati weightlifter, brother of David

Surnames of Oceanian origin